Daniil Dmitriyevich Fomin (born 2 March 1997) is a Russian professional footballer who plays as a defensive midfielder for Dynamo Moscow and the Russia national team.

Club career

Krasnodar 
Fomin made his debut in the Russian Professional Football League for FC Krasnodar-2 on 7 October 2014 in a game against FC Torpedo Armavir. He made his debut for the main squad of FC Krasnodar in the Russian Cup game against PFC Spartak Nalchik on 21 September 2016.

Ufa 
On 26 June 2019, Fomin signed a contract with FC Ufa. He made his debut in the Russian Premier League for FC Ufa on 14 July 2019 in a game against FC Ural Yekaterinburg and scored a goal on his debut in a 2–3 loss.

Dynamo Moscow 
On 3 August 2020, Fomin signed a 5-year contract with FC Dynamo Moscow. 

On 29 May 2022, Fomin missed the penalty kick in the 2022 Russian Cup Final against FC Spartak Moscow deep in added time that would have equalized the score. Before that kick, he converted 23 consecutive penalty kick attempts in his career, and 25 out of 26 overall.

International career
He was called up to the Russia national football team for the first time for the UEFA Euro 2020 qualifying matches against Belgium and San Marino in November 2019. He made his debut on 11 October 2020 in a Nations League game against Turkey.

On 11 May 2021, he was included in the preliminary extended 30-man squad for UEFA Euro 2020. On 2 June 2021, he was included in the final squad. He did not appear in any games as Russia was eliminated at group stage.

Career statistics

Club

International

References

External links
 

1997 births
People from Tikhoretsk
Living people
Russian footballers
Russia youth international footballers
Russia under-21 international footballers
Russia international footballers
Association football midfielders
FC Krasnodar players
FC Nizhny Novgorod (2015) players
FC Ufa players
FC Dynamo Moscow players
Russian Premier League players
UEFA Euro 2020 players
FC Krasnodar-2 players
Sportspeople from Krasnodar Krai